The Stephen T. Birdsall House is a historic house located at 186–192 Ridge Street in Glens Falls, Warren County, New York.

Description and history 
It was built in 1884, and is a -story, asymmetrical, shingle-covered Queen Anne–style frame residence. It features a slate-covered roof with multiple gables on several sides and a partial wrap-around porch at ground level. Also on the property is a contributing carriage house.

It was added to the National Register of Historic Places on September 29, 1984.

See also
 National Register of Historic Places listings in Warren County, New York

References

Houses on the National Register of Historic Places in New York (state)
Queen Anne architecture in New York (state)
Houses completed in 1884
Houses in Warren County, New York
National Register of Historic Places in Warren County, New York